Charlotte Bertrand is an American government official who had served as the Acting Administrator of the Environmental Protection Agency for a few hours following the resignation of the previous Administrator of the Environmental Protection Agency Andrew R. Wheeler at noon on January 20, 2021 until President Joe Biden signed an executive order naming the principal deputy assistant administrator in the Office of International and Tribal Affairs of the U.S. Environmental Protection Agency Jane Nishida as the Acting Administrator of the Environmental Protection Agency later that day.

References

Year of birth missing (living people)
Living people
Administrators of the United States Environmental Protection Agency
Biden administration cabinet members